Dursun Ali Atay (born 20 April 1976) is a Turkish actor, musician, screenwriter and director.

Life and career 
Atay graduated from the theatre department of Mimar Sinan Fine Arts University. He is best known for his role as Mecnun in the hit surreal comedy series Leyla ile Mecnun. He is the recipient of Tribeca Best Actor Award. He has appeared in more than fifteen films and theatre plays since 1999.

He played in surreal art house film "Sen Aydınlatırsın Geceyi" with Demet Evgar, Damla Sönmez, Ahmet Mümtaz Taylan, which released at Toronto International Film Festival. 
He later appeared  in film Ayla as Ali Astubay on Turkey's entry for the 90th Academy Awards.
Atay then got lead role in the movie Nuh Tepesi. 

Atay got a major role on comedy series Mutlu Ol Yeter, alongside Aslı Enver, Öner Erkan and Ertan Saban. In 2017, he appeared portrayed the character of Commissioner Yusuf on BluTV's first online Turkish series Masum. He shared the leading role with Haluk Bilginer, Nur Sürer and Okan Yalabık. He later played in series "Son Yaz".

In June 2014, the shooting of his new movie, Limonata, began. The movie marked his first experience as a director and scenarist, and actors such as Serkan Keskin and Ertan Saban were cast as the leading roles in it. He directed the action-comedy movie Ölümlü Dünya, which was released in 2018.

Filmography

Director
2015 Limonata
2018 Ölümlü Dünya
2019 Cinayet Süsü

Film

Television

Songs

Covers

References

External links 

1976 births
Living people
Turkish male film actors
Turkish male television actors
Mimar Sinan Fine Arts University alumni
People from Rize